Ida Albertina Törnström or Sölve (24 March 1862 – 26 August 1949) was a Swedish writer, teacher and painter.

Life 
Törnström was born in Gothenburg in 1862.  

Ida went with her father who was a sea captain to England and Canada in 1875. She returned and completed her schooling in Gothenburg. She continued her studies at the Technical School in Stockholm and then with Reinhold Callmander, Carl Larsson and Bruno Liljefors at Valand's painting school in Gothenburg. 1886– 1889th

In the summer of 1891 she stayed in Portugal and to France, where she spent some time in Grez before traveling to Paris. In Paris she studied with the French painter Henri Gervex. She returned to her home town in 1892 where she gave private drawing lessons. She worked as a drawing teacher at the Kjellbergska girls' school in Gothenburg from 1896 and at her teacher's seminar from 1908, at Sigrid Rudebeck's school from 1908 to 1913 and at the Gothenburg Women's Folk School seminar from 1909 to 1912. Under the pseudonym Sölve, she published her poetry collections Dichterr in 1900 and Rhythmic magic. Collected poems  in 1922. In addition her work appeared in magazines and daily press.

She and her sister Anna published in 1906 in the journal Varia Around the turn of the century. Their travel memories and Gothenburg pictures published in 1937.

Her art consists of still life, interiors, cityscapes from Sweden and Denmark as well as forest landscapes. Her paintings were included in the Salon in Paris in 1892 and she participated in the Swedish Artist's Exhibition in Vienna in 1913. She was involved with exhibitions at the Art Academy in 1911 as well as at Liljevalch's Art Hall in 1917. She participated in collections exhibitions in Lund, Helsingborg and in Gothenburg.  She drew several ex-libris and performed several illustrative assignments, including illustrating Viktor Rydberg's poem Childhood Poetry. Törnström is represented at the National Museum in Stockholm and Gothenburg City Museum.

Törnström died in Gothenburg in 1949.

References

External links

1862 births
1949 deaths
People from Gothenburg
Swedish women poets
Swedish women painters
Swedish painters